A Tipperary County Council election was held in Ireland on 23 May 2014 as part of that year's local elections. Forty councillors were elected from a field of 85 candidates for a five-year term of office from five local electoral areas by proportional representation with a single transferable vote.

Results by party

Results by Electoral Area

Carrick-on-Suir

Cashel-Tipperary

Clonmel

Nenagh

Templemore-Thurles

References

Changes since 2014
† Clonmel Independent Cllr Richie Molloy joined Renua on 29 May 2015 and ceased to be an Independent.  He subsequently quit the party and became an Independent again.
†† On 7 March 2016 Templemore-Thurles Independent Cllr Willie Kennedy was killed in a road traffic accident.  Eddie Moran was co-opted to fill the vacancy on 11 April 2016. 
††† Templemore-Thurles Fianna Fáil Cllr Jackie Cahill was elected as a TD for Tipperary at the Irish general election, 2016. Sean Ryan was co-opted to fill the vacancy on 14 March 2016.
†††† Carrick-on-Suir Independent Cllr Kieran Bourke re-joined Fianna Fáil in early July 2016.
††††† Nenagh Sinn Féin Cllr Seamus Morris resigned from the party on 9 November 2017 citing rogue elements and unfounded allegations and became an Independent.  He joined Peadar Tóibín's movement on 27 November 2018.
†††††† Carrick-on-Suir Independent Cllr Eddie O'Meara died suddenly on 13 April 2018 after a short illness. In September 2018 his son, Kevin, was co-opted to fill the vacancy.
††††††† Carrick-on-Suir Fine Gael Cllr John Fahey died suddenly on 28 October 2018. A co-option will occur in due course.
†††††††† Templemore-Thurles Sinn Féin Cllr David Doran resigned from the party and became an Independent on 24 January 2019 saying he was ostracised by elements in the party.

External links 
 

2014 Irish local elections
2014